The 2000 West Asian Football Federation Championship, also known as the King Hussein Cup, was the first edition of the WAFF Championship; it took part in Amman, the capital of Jordan. Iran won the final against Syria 1–0. The eight entrants were Iraq, Iran, Syria, Palestine, Lebanon, Kazakhstan (invited nation), Kyrgyzstan (invited nation), and host nation Jordan. The finals took place between 23 May and 3 June 2000.

The teams were grouped into two groups of four, playing a round-robin format. Semi-finals and finals followed, played by the top two teams from each group.

Participants

The first West Asian Cup was the only one with two guest members, from the Central Asian Football Association. Every country affiliated with WAFF was invited the tournament: Jordan—host nation—, Iran, Syria, Palestine, Iraq, and Lebanon, while two places where given two Kyrgyzstan and Kazakhstan. A total of eight teams participated.

Venues
All matches took place in Amman. One stadium was used, the King Abdullah II Stadium.

Match officials
Twenty referees and ten linesmen participated in the tournament: sixteen from participating teams, and four from neutral countries.

The following is the list of officials who served as referees and (in italic) linesmen: 

West Asian Country
 Salem Mahmoud
 Awni Hassounah
 Rahim Mojahed
 Fallah Khohi
 Hussain Isa
 Ahmad Khodair
 Talnat Najem
 Ismaeel Azzam
 Asheeq Abbas
 Mou'taz Yagmour
 Najem Abu Imran
 Mahyoub El Sadeq

Guest Participate 
 Viktor Kolpakov
 Bahadyr Kochkarov
 Kormanbek Ordbayeev
 Sergi Roveniski

Neutral Nation
 Ali Al Khaleefi
 Yosef Al Oqaily
 Malek Al Shakhi
 Ibrahim Abdel Hameed

Group stage

Group A

Group B

Knockout phase

Semi-finals

Third place match

Final

Champion

Statistics

Goalscorers

References

External links
 Details at RSSSF
 Schedule & results
 Details at goalzz.com

 
2000 in Asian football
2000
2000
1999–2000 in Jordanian football
1999–2000 in Iranian football
1999–2000 in Iraqi football
2000 in Kazakhstani football
2000 in Kyrgyzstani football
1999–2000 in Lebanese football
1999–2000 in Syrian football
2000 in Palestinian football